Nicolai Johan Lohmann Krog (6 July 1787 – 15 October 1856) was First Minister of Norway (1836–1855). He also held several other ministerial posts in the period 1821–1855 including Chief of the Ministry of the Army and Navy.

Krog was born at Drangedal  in Telemark, Norway. He was the son of  Andreas Christian von Krogh and Else Marie Poppe.  He grow up at Gran Rectory in Hadeland(Gran prestegård på Hadeland)  where his father was parish priest. Krog started his military education as a cadet at the Norwegian Land Cadet Corps in Christiania (now Oslo). He graduated as a second lieutenants in 1805.

In 1814, he was in the  service of Prince Christian Frederik of Denmark as adjutant in his general staff. Krog was promoted to Major in 1815. From July 1816, he was commanding chief  of the Royal Norwegian Military Academy.  He was promoted to lieutenant colonel in 1817. In 1821, Krog was called to Stockholm as acting minister, and  followed  Crown Prince Oscar on his European tour to find a bride. He served as  First Minister of Norway from 1836 to 1855. He resigned as a government minister in 1855 and died at Christiania in 1856 and was buried at Krist kirkegård.

References 

1787 births
1856 deaths
People from Telemark
Government ministers of Norway
19th-century Norwegian politicians
Norwegian military personnel of the Napoleonic Wars
Norwegian Military College alumni
Academic staff of the Norwegian Military Academy
Knights of the Order of Charles XIII
Defence ministers of Norway